Chen Shu-chu (born 1950) is a vegetable vendor and philanthropist from Taitung County, Taiwan.

Biography
Shu-chu Chen graduated from Jen-Ai elementary school at Taitung City, Taiwan. She lived in a household of eight who were all dependent on her father, a vegetable vendor. Her mother died due to obstructed labour because the family could not afford the medical expenses. After her mother's death, Chen, then 13, began working as a vegetable vendor in the Taitung Central Market to earn money for her family. However, her youngest brother died in 1969 from influenza after the family again was unable to afford treatment. Shu-chu took over the burden of earning a living so her older brother could go to college. Her second youngest brother later died from a  traffic accident. 

After her father died in 1993, Shu-chu donated NT$1 million to Fo Guang Buddhist Academy. In 1997, she donated NT$1 million to her alma mater, Jen-Ai elementary school. Since she could not afford to go to school as a child, she wanted to help more children to receive better education. She then donated NT$4.5 million to Jen-Ai elementary school to build its own library.  

As of 2014, she had donated over NT$10 million (Equivalent to $350,000 American dollars or £210,000 British pounds). 

Shu-chu adopted three abandoned kids at the Christian KidsAlive International Association, and donates NT$36,000 to the organization every year.

In 2018 Shu-chu Chen was invited to attend the flag-raising ceremony during the National Day of the Republic of China held by Taitung City Government. In the ceremony, she announced that she had donated her two life insurance policies to East-based Medical Foundation Taitung Christian Hospital and Mackay Memorial Hospital Taitung Branch to set up "Ms. Chen Shu-chu Medical Fund for Poor and Cancer Patients" and "Ms. Chen Shu-chu Medical Fund for Charities", respectively. The two insurance policies are worth NT$16,000,000. The money will be paid by the insurer upon the death of Chen Shu-Chu.

Also in 2018, Chen officially retired following a bout of appendicitis early in the year, and moved to Kaohsiung.

In 2021 Chen, in honor of her mother, donated NT$15 million to create a fund to provide financial aid to pregnant women and scholarships to children who lose their mothers in childbirth.

Personal life 
Chen is a Buddhist and a vegetarian. She has never married.

Book
Chen, Shu-chu: Extraordinary Generosity is a biography of Shu-chu Chen written by Yung-yi Liu. The writer spent about half a year interviewing Shu-chu.

Accolades 
She was selected as one of the Time 100 for year 2010 in the heroes category. She was also one of the 48 heroes of philanthropy by Forbes in 2010. Reader's Digest also honoured her as the winner of 2010 Asian of the year.  

In 2012, she was selected as a Ramon Magsaysay Award winner. She donated her US$50,000 prize to Mackay Memorial Hospital. 

In 2018, the asteroid 278986 Chenshuchu was named for her.

References

Taiwanese Buddhists
Taiwanese philanthropists
Taiwanese people of Hoklo descent
Living people
Year of birth uncertain
People from Taitung County
Ramon Magsaysay Award winners
1951 births